The 1996–97 Nemzeti Bajnokság I, also known as NB I, was the 95th season of top-tier football in Hungary. The season started on 10 August 1996 and ended on 28 May 1997.

Overview
It was contested by 18 teams, and MTK Hungária FC won the championship.

League standings

Results

Relegation play-offs 

|}

Statistical leaders

Top goalscorers

References
Hungary - List of final tables (RSSSF)

Nemzeti Bajnokság I seasons
1996–97 in Hungarian football
Hun